The 2014 Topshelf Open was a tennis tournament played on outdoor grass courts. It was the 25th edition of the Rosmalen Grass Court Championships, and was part of the 250 Series of the 2014 ATP World Tour, and of the WTA International tournaments of the 2014 WTA Tour. Both the men's and the women's events took place at the Autotron park in Rosmalen, 's-Hertogenbosch, Netherlands, from June 15 through June 21, 2014.

Points and prize money

Point distribution

Prize money

ATP singles main-draw entrants

Seeds

 1 Rankings are as of 9 June 2014.

Other entrants
The following players received wildcards into the main draw:
 Thiemo de Bakker
 Kimmer Coppejans
 Jesse Huta Galung

The following players received entry from the qualifying draw:
 Lukáš Lacko
 Adrian Mannarino
 Mate Pavić
 João Sousa

The following player received entry as a lucky loser:
 Paolo Lorenzi

Withdrawals
Before the tournament
 David Ferrer (virus)
 Łukasz Kubot
 Leonardo Mayer

During the tournament
 Dmitry Tursunov

ATP doubles main-draw entrants

Seeds

1 Rankings are as of 9 June 2014.

Other entrants
The following pairs received wildcards into the doubles main draw:
  Dustin Brown /  Henri Kontinen
  Thiemo de Bakker /  Igor Sijsling

The following pairs received entry as alternates:
  Stephan Fransen /  Wesley Koolhof
  João Sousa /  Jan-Lennard Struff

Withdrawals
Before the tournament
  Benoît Paire (knee injury)

WTA singles main-draw entrants

Seeds

 1 Rankings are as of 9 June 2014.

Other entrants
The following players received wildcards into the main draw:
 Lesley Kerkhove
 Michaëlla Krajicek
 An-Sophie Mestach

The following players received entry from the qualifying draw:
 Mona Barthel
 Julia Glushko
 Olga Govortsova
 CoCo Vandeweghe

Withdrawals
Before the tournament
 Karin Knapp --> replaced by Yaroslava Shvedova
 Romina Oprandi --> replaced by Zheng Saisai

Retirements
 Simona Halep (thoracic spine injury)
 Vania King (thoracic spine injury)
 Carla Suárez Navarro (lower back injury)

WTA doubles main-draw entrants

Seeds

1 Rankings are as of 9 June 2014.

Other entrants
The following pair received a wildcard into the doubles main draw:
  Demi Schuurs /  Alison Van Uytvanck

Champions

Men's singles

  Roberto Bautista Agut defeated  Benjamin Becker, 2–6, 7–6(7–2), 6–4

Women's singles

  CoCo Vandeweghe defeated  Zheng Jie, 6–2, 6–4

Men's doubles

  Jean-Julien Rojer /  Horia Tecău defeated  Santiago González /  Scott Lipsky, 6–3, 7–6(7–3)

Women's doubles

  Marina Erakovic /  Arantxa Parra Santonja defeated  Michaëlla Krajicek /  Kristina Mladenovic, 0–6, 7–6(7–5), [10–8]

References

External links 
 

Topshelf Open
Topshelf Open
Topshelf Open
Rosmalen Grass Court Championships